21 Ways to Ruin a Marriage is a 2013 Finnish film written and directed by Johanna Vuoksenmaa. It was the highest grossing locally produced movie of the year in Finland.

Main cast 

Armi Toivanen as Sanna Manner  
Essi Hellén as Aino
Riku Nieminen as Aleksi
Aku Hirviniemi as Jouni
Pamela Tola as Elli 
Hannele Lauri as Eila Manner
Jarkko Niemi as Lauri

References

Finnish comedy films
2013 films
Films directed by Johanna Vuoksenmaa
2010s Finnish-language films